Heintje: A Heart Goes on a Journey is a 1969 West German musical film directed by Werner Jacobs and starring Heintje Simons, Heinz Reincke and Gerlinde Locker.

Cast
 Heintje Simons: Heinz 'Heintje' Gruber
 Heinz Reincke: Alfred Teichmann
 Gerlinde Locker: Hanna Schwarz
 Solvi Stubing: Gerdi Weber
 Ralf Wolter: Harry
 Mogens von Gadow: Hugo Neubert
 Karin Field: Else
 Sieghardt Rupp: Günter Schelle
 Dagmar Altrichter: Monika Klausen
 Peter W. Staub: Wache
 Hans Terofal: Rudi
 Edith Hancke: Lieschen
 Konrad Georg: Polizei-Inspektor
 Rudolf Schündler: Rektor Neumann

References

External links
 

1969 films
1960s musical films
German musical films
West German films
1960s German-language films
Films directed by Werner Jacobs
Constantin Film films
1960s German films